Mojtame-e Sanati-ye Baharestan (also Romanized as Mojtame`-e Sanʿatī Bahārestān) is a village in Qaleh Now Rural District, Qaleh Now District, Ray County, Tehran Province, Iran. At the 2006 census, its population was 49, in 31 families.

References 

Populated places in Ray County, Iran